is a Japanese manga series written and illustrated by Osamu Akimoto. Firstly published as a three-one-shot story in Shueisha's seinen manga magazine Super Jump in 1994, it was serialized in Ultra Jump from March 2017 to June 2019, with its chapters collected in two tankōbon volumes.

Publication
Written and illustrated by Osamu Akimoto, Ii Yu da ne! was originally published as a three-one-shot story in Shueisha's seinen manga magazine Super Jump in 1994. It was years later serialized in Ultra Jump (serving as a sequel to KochiKame: Tokyo Beat Cops) from March 18, 2017, to June 19, 2019. Shueisha collected its chapters in two tankōbon volumes, released on April 19, 2018, and August 19, 2019.

Volume list

References

External links
 

Comedy anime and manga
Seinen manga
Shueisha manga